Big Knife Provincial Park is a small provincial park in central Alberta, Canada. It was established in 1962 on the Battle River, at the confluence with Big Knife Creek, and is located between the villages of Donalda and Forestburg, 10 km south of Highway 53, 88 km from the city of Camrose. According to tradition, Big Knife Creek's name commemorates a battle between two Aboriginal Canadians, namely Big Man and Knife.

Activities
Many activities in the park are water related and include canoeing, kayaking, swimming, fishing and power boating. Birdwatching and camping at the Big Knife Campground are also popular. The park is open during the summer (from May to September), with only limited access during the winter months.

See also
List of provincial parks in Alberta
List of Canadian provincial parks
List of National Parks of Canada

References

External links
Alberta Community Development - Big Knife Provincial Park

County of Paintearth No. 18
Provincial parks of Alberta